"Gigolo" is a song by American actor and rapper Nick Cannon. It was released in October 2003 as the third single from his self-titled debut studio album Nick Cannon.  It features vocals and production from R. Kelly. The single peaked at number nine on the Hot Rap Tracks chart, and number twenty-four on the Billboard Hot 100 chart. To date, it is Cannon’s only song to chart.

Music Video 
The music video directed by Erik White. Katt Williams & DJ D-Wrek also make a cameo appearance in the video.

Charts

Weekly charts

Year-end charts

Release history

References

2003 singles
R. Kelly songs
Songs written by R. Kelly
Music videos directed by Erik White
Song recordings produced by R. Kelly
2003 songs
Jive Records singles